A caul or cowl (literally, "helmeted head") is a piece of membrane that can cover a newborn's head and face. Birth with a caul is rare, occurring in less than 1 in 80,000 births. The caul is harmless and is immediately removed by the attending parent, physician, or midwife upon birth of the child.

An en-caul birth is different from a caul birth in that the infant is born inside the entire amniotic sac (instead of just a portion of it). The sac balloons out at birth, with the amniotic fluid and child remaining inside the unbroken or partially broken membrane.

Types

A child 'born with the caul' has a portion of a birth membrane remaining on the head. There are two types of caul membranes, and such cauls can appear in four ways.

The most common caul type is a piece of the thin translucent inner lining of the amnion that breaks away and forms tightly against the head during birth. Such a caul typically clings to the head and face but on rarer occasions drapes over the head and partly down the torso.

Removal
The caul is harmless and is immediately removed by the attending parent, physician, or midwife upon birth of the child. If the membrane is of the amniotic tissue, it is removed by easily slipping it away from the child's skin. The removal of the thicker membrane is more complex. If done correctly, the attending practitioner will make a small incision in the membrane across the nostrils so that the child can breathe. The loops are then carefully removed from behind the ears. The remainder of the caul is then either peeled back very carefully from the skin or else gently rubbed with a sheet of paper, which is then peeled away.  If removed too quickly, the caul can leave wounds on the infant's flesh at the attachment points, which might leave permanent scars.

Epidemiology
Birth with a caul is rare, occurring in fewer than 1 in 80,000 births. This statistic includes en-caul births, which occur more frequently than authentic caul births; therefore, authentic caul births are even more rare than indicated by the raw statistic. Most en-caul births are premature.

Folk traditions
According to Aelius Lampridius, the boy-emperor Diadumenian (208–218) was so named because he was born with a diadem formed by a rolled caul.

In medieval times, the appearance of a caul on a newborn baby was seen as a sign of good luck. It was considered an omen that the child was destined for greatness. Gathering the caul onto paper was considered an important tradition of childbirth: the midwife would rub a sheet of paper across the baby's head and face, pressing the material of the caul onto the paper. The caul would then be presented to the mother, to be kept as an heirloom. Some Early Modern European traditions linked caul birth to the ability to defend fertility and the harvest against the forces of evil, particularly witches and sorcerers.

Folklore developed suggesting that possession of a baby's caul would bring its bearer good luck and protect that person from death by drowning. Cauls were therefore highly prized by sailors. Medieval women often sold them to sailors for large sums of money; a caul was regarded as a valuable talisman.

In Polish the idiom  ('born in a bonnet'), in Italian  ('born with a shirt') and in French né(e) coiffé(e) ('born with a hat on') all describe a person who is always very lucky.

The Russian phrase  (rodilsya v rubashke, literally 'born in a shirt') refers to caul birth and means 'born lucky'. It is often applied to someone who is oblivious to an impending disaster that is avoided only through luck, as if the birth caul persists as supernatural armor, and in this sense commonly appears in titles or descriptions of Russian dashcam videos.

Not all cultural beliefs about cauls are positive. In Romanian folklore babies born with a caul are said to become strigoi upon death. It was also believed that "he who is born to be hanged will never drown" - that anyone born with a caul was destined to leave the world in a hangman's hood in place of the caul with which they were born. The belief in cauls as omens persisted well into the 20th century.

The 16th century Dutch physician Levinus Lemnius, author of The Secret Miracles of Nature, remained skeptical of superstitious claims about preserved cauls.  Comic writer Thomas Hood even ended his poem "The Sea-Spell" with a lament about a drowning sailor's futile reliance on a protection charm:
     * "Heaven never heard his cry,
     * Nor did the ocean heed his caul."

Notable people born "in the caul"
 Barbara Barondess (1907-2000), American actress
 Edwin Booth (1833-1893), American actor
 Lord Byron
 David Copperfield
 Gabriele d'Annunzio
 J. G. Farrell, novelist
 Charles Haughey, Taoiseach na hÉireann (Prime Minister of Ireland)
 George Formby, English comedian
 Roksana Węgiel, Polish musical artist
 Sigmund Freud
 Johnny Giles
 Lillian Gish
 Liberace
 Edna St. Vincent Millay
 Kim Woodburn
 Jonas Salk
 Abraham Ribicoff
Nancy Wake
Charles XII of Sweden
Lee Shelton (disputed)
Joseph Smith
Andrew Jackson Davis

In popular culture
In the classic 1850 novel David Copperfield by Charles Dickens, the title character and novel narrator describes his own birth: "I was born with a caul, which was advertised for sale, in the newspapers, at the low price of fifteen guineas." Copperfield goes on to describe the fate of his caul, which was re-sold and raffled over the subsequent decade as a talisman believed to protect its owner from death by drowning.

In the novel Oscar and Lucinda by Peter Carey, Theophilus Hopkins, father of the hero, Oscar, gives to his son a little box, inside which there is "a caul, the little membrane that had covered Oscar’s head at birth and it had been kept, his mother had kept it, because it was said – superstitiously, of course – that such a thing would protect the child from drowning".

An en caul birth is depicted in the episode "Heavy Hangs the Head" (S03E01) of the Apple TV+ science fiction series See.

In The Shining, Danny Torrance is born with a caul, possibly causing his clairvoyant abilities.

See also
Childbirth

References

External links

 "Caul, or Face Veil, Occasionally Present at Birth"
 Folklore of the Isle of Man, Ch. 8
 Caul Bearers United: Authentic Caul History, includes references from The Social History of the Caul by Dr. Thomas R. Forbes

Obstetrics
Midwifery